The South African Historical Journal is a quarterly peer-reviewed academic journal covering research on the Southern African region. It was established in 1969 and is published on behalf of the South African Historical Society by the University of South Africa and published internationally by Taylor & Francis.

Abstracting and indexing 

The journal is abstracted and indexed in:

The journal has a 2014 impact factor of 0.484.

References

External links 

 
 South African Historical Society

Publications established in 1969
English-language journals
Quarterly journals
Academic journals associated with learned and professional societies
Routledge academic journals
African history journals
Academic journals published in South Africa